The Trans-Fly languages are a small family of Papuan languages proposed by Timothy Usher, that are spoken in the region of the Fly River.

Languages
Trans-Fly
Eastern Trans-Fly (Oriomo Plateau)
Pahoturi (Paho River)
Waia (Tabo)

Typology
The inclusive vs. exclusive first-person pronoun distinction is found in the Pahoturi River and Oriomo families, as well as in the Western Torres Strait language, but not in other languages of Southern New Guinea.

See also
Trans-Fly–Bulaka River languages

References

 
Languages of Papua New Guinea
Language families
Papuan languages